Hugh William Osbert Molyneux, 7th Earl of Sefton (22 December 1898 – 13 April 1972) was the last Earl of Sefton. His family seats were Croxteth Hall and Abbeystead House in Lancashire; he also held the Wyresdale Forest, an estate in the Forest of Bowland, and Grosvenor Cottage, a property in Culross Street, Mayfair, London. 

His grandfather, William Philip Molyneux, 2nd Earl of Sefton, founded the Waterloo Cup and the Grand National.

Early life
Molyneux was the eldest son of Osbert Molyneux, 6th Earl of Sefton (1871–1930). He had a younger brother, Cecil, and a sister Evelyn. He was educated at West Downs School, Harrow School and the Royal Military College, Sandhurst. During the First World War, he served as an officer in the Royal Horse Guards in France and Belgium. 

After pursuing a military career, he was appointed aide-de-camp to the Governor-General of Canada (1919), to the Viceroy of India, Lord-in-waiting to the King (1936–37) and Lord Mayor of Liverpool (1944–45). As a sporting enthusiast, he owned racehorses, including Medoc II (FR) which won the Cheltenham Gold Cup in 1942, St Lucia which won the 1958 Coronation Stakes and Irish Lizard which twice finished third in the Grand National, in 1953 and 1954. 

Molyneux was also chairman of the stewards of the British Jockey Club.

Personal life
In 1941, Molyneux married Josephine Gwynne Armstrong (1903–1980), daughter of George Armstrong of Virginia, United States. He was a life-long friend of the Duke of Windsor (he had been a Lord-in-waiting when Edward reigned in 1936) and his wife was a good friend of the Duchess of Windsor.

Death
Molyneux died on 13 April 1972. On his death, the earldom became extinct because he had no living heirs. His 16-year-old brother Cecil, had died aboard HMS Lion at the Battle of Jutland in 1916 and his 14-year-old sister a year later. The family seat at Croxteth Hall passed to Liverpool City Council. 

On his widow's death in 1980, Abbeystead and the Wyresdale Forest estate were sold to the Duke of Westminster.

See also
 Earl of Sefton Stakes

References

External links

 www.thepeerage.com. Retrieved 18 May 2010.
Diaries and papers of the family of Molyneux of Sefton (1815–1953). Reference 920 SEF. Liverpool Record Office and Local History Service. www.nationalarchives.gov.uk. Retrieved 18 May 2010.

1898 births
1972 deaths
Mayors of Liverpool
People educated at Harrow School
Graduates of the Royal Military College, Sandhurst
People educated at West Downs School
British racehorse owners and breeders
Earls of Sefton